Hanna Serhiyivna Poznikhirenko (born 8 April 1994) is a Ukrainian tennis player.

She has career-high WTA rankings of 255 in singles, achieved on 28 May 2018, and of 214 in doubles, reached on 27 August 2018.

Poznikhirenko won her first $60k title in 2018 at the Internazionali di Brescia in the doubles draw, partnering Cristina Dinu.

ITF Circuit finals

Singles: 11 (4 titles, 7 runner–ups)

Doubles: 23 (10 titles, 13 runner–ups)

External links
 
 
 

1994 births
Living people
Ukrainian female tennis players
Sportspeople from Kyiv
21st-century Ukrainian women